This is a list of islands of the Kingdom of the Netherlands.

West Frisian Islands (in the Wadden Sea)

Noorderhaaks
Texel
Vlieland
Richel
Terschelling
Griend
Ameland
Rif
Engelsmanplaat
Schiermonnikoog
Simonszand
Rottumerplaat
Rottumeroog
Zuiderduintjes

In South Holland
Dordrecht Island
Goeree-Overflakkee
Hoeksche Waard
IJsselmonde
Kaag and some uninhabited islands in the Kagerplassen
Rozenburg
Tiengemeten
Voorne-Putten

Islands and former islands in Zeeland
Some of the following islands have become peninsulas. Others are still considered to be islands although they are connected to the mainland with bridges.
Neeltje-Jans, artificial island
Noord-Beveland
Schouwen-Duiveland
Sint Philipsland
Tholen
Walcheren
Zuid-Beveland

Islands in the IJsselmeer, Markermeer, or former Zuiderzee
Flevopolder, the world's largest artificial island
IJsseloog
Marken
Pampus
Vuurtoreneiland
Wieringen, Schokland and Urk are former islands, now part of a polder
De Kreupel, an artificial island, constructed to be a bird refuge
The Marker Wadden archipelago, a collection of artificial islands in the Markermeer

Islands in the Caribbean

Aruba
Bonaire
Camia
Curaçao
Green Island
Guana Cay
Hen and Chicken
Indiaanskop
Isla Makuka
Kadoesji
Key Cay
Klein Bonaire
Klein Curaçao
Little Island
Little Key
Long Cay
Mal Aborder
Meeuwtje
Mollibeday Rots
Mona Island
Pelican Island
Penso
Rancho
Ronde Island
Saba
Sint Eustatius
Sapaté Eiland
Sint Maarten (section of island also shared with France)
Willemberg

See also 

 List of islands in the Caribbean
 List of islands

Netherlands, List of islands of the

Islands